Twardowice  is a village in the administrative district of Gmina Bobrowniki, within Będzin County, Silesian Voivodeship, in southern Poland.

The village has a population of 381.

References

Twardowice